Menegazzia subbullata is a species of foliose lichen found in Australia and southern South America. It was formally described as a species new to science in 1987 by lichenologists Peter James and Gintaras Kantvilas. The type specimen was collected in Tasmania, where it was found in a coniferous heath growing on Mount Mawson pine. It has also been found in mainland Australia. Its first report outside of Australasia was in 2002, when it was recorded in Patagonia, Argentina. The lichen has been found to grow both on bark and on rocks.

See also
 List of Menegazzia species

References

subbullata
Lichen species
Lichens described in 1987
Lichens of Australia
Lichens of southern South America
Taxa named by Peter Wilfred James
Taxa named by Gintaras Kantvilas